Tartar Island is a small (13 ha), ice-free, oval-shaped island  long, lying  north-west of Round Point, off the north coast of King George Island in the South Shetland Islands of Antarctica. It was named by the United Kingdom Antarctic Place-Names Committee (UK-APC) in 1960 for the sealing vessel Tartar (Captain Pottinger) from London, which visited the South Shetland Islands in 1821–22.

Important Bird Area
The island has been designated an Important Bird Area (IBA) by BirdLife International because it supports a breeding colony of about 18,000 pairs of chinstrap penguins.

See also 
 List of Antarctic and subantarctic islands

References

Islands of King George Island (South Shetland Islands)
Important Bird Areas of Antarctica
Penguin colonies